Kozielice  (formerly German Köselitz) is a village in Pyrzyce County, West Pomeranian Voivodeship, in north-western Poland. It is the seat of the gmina (administrative district) called Gmina Kozielice.

For the history of the region, see History of Pomerania.

References

Villages in Pyrzyce County